Shamsabad-e Arab (also Romanized as Shamsābād-e ‘Arab; also known as Shamsābād) is a village in Behnamarab-e Jonubi Rural District, Javadabad District, Varamin County, Tehran Province, Iran. At the 2006 census, its population was 275, in 64 families.

References 

Populated places in Varamin County